Federman was an unincorporated community in Monroe County, Michigan.  It was located where the Lake Shore and Michigan Southern Railroad and the Toledo, Ann Arbor and Northern Michigan Railroad intersected.  It was formed in 1884 and had a post office from 1899 until 1906.  It is now abandoned.

Sources

Ghost towns in Michigan
Former populated places in Monroe County, Michigan
Populated places established in 1884
1884 establishments in Michigan